Statistics of the Scottish Football League in season 2003–04.

Scottish First Division

League standings

Top scorers

Scottish Second Division

League standings

Top scorers

Scottish Third Division

League standings

Top scorers

See also
2003–04 in Scottish football

References

 
Scottish Football League seasons